

Events

January–March
 January 1 – Abraham Lincoln signs the Emancipation Proclamation during the third year of the American Civil War, making the abolition of slavery in the Confederate states an official war goal. It proclaims the freedom of 3.1 million of the nation's four million slaves and immediately frees 50,000 of them, with the rest freed as Union armies advance.
 January 2 – Lucius Tar Painting Master Company (Teerfarbenfabrik Meirter Lucius), predecessor of Hoechst, as a worldwide chemical manufacturing brand, founded in a suburb of Frankfurt am Main, Germany.   
 January 4 – The New Apostolic Church, a Christian and chiliastic church, is established in Hamburg, Germany.
 January 7 – In the Swiss canton of Ticino, the village of Bedretto is partly destroyed and 29 killed, by an avalanche.
 January 8
 The Yorkshire County Cricket Club is founded at the Adelphi Hotel, in Sheffield, England. 
 American Civil War – Second Battle of Springfield
 January 10 – The first section of the London Underground Railway (Paddington to Farringdon Street) opens officially.
 January 11
 American Civil War – Battle of Arkansas Post: General John McClernand and Admiral David Dixon Porter capture the Arkansas River for the Union.
 In the Swiss Canton Ticino, the roof of the church of Sant'Antonio in Locarno collapses under the weight of snow, killing 47.
 January 15 – French intervention in Mexico: French forces bombard Veracruz.
 January 21 – Adam Opel founds Opel AG.
 January 22 – The January Uprising breaks out in Poland, Lithuania and Belarus. The aim of the national movement is to liberate the Polish–Lithuanian–Ruthenian Commonwealth from Russian occupation.
 January 29 – American Indian Wars – Bear River Massacre: The United States Army, led by General Patrick Edward Connor, massacres Chief Bear Hunter and forces of the Shoshone, in the Idaho Territory.
 January 31 – Jules Verne's first adventure novel, Five Weeks in a Balloon (Cinq semaines en ballon), is published in Paris.

 February 1 – Radicals in Lithuania, Belarus, Latvia, northern Ukraine and western Russia join the January Uprising.
 February 2 – January Uprising: Polish peasants are massacred by Russian hussars at Čysta Būda, near Marijampolė.
 February 7 –  sinks, while attempting to enter Manukau Harbour in New Zealand, with the loss of 189 lives.
 February 10 – Alanson Crane of Virginia patents a fire extinguisher.
 February 17 – The "Committee of the Five" holds their first meeting in Geneva, Switzerland, which is regarded as the foundation of the International Committee of the Red Cross, following the lead of humanitarian businessman Henry Dunant.
 February 24 – Arizona is organized as a United States territory.
 February 26 – Abraham Lincoln signs the National Banking Act into law.
 March 3
 Idaho Territory is organized by the U.S. Congress.
 The U.S. National Conscription Act is signed, leading to the New York City draft riots in July.
 March 10 – Albert Edward, Prince of Wales (later Edward VII) marries Princess Alexandra of Denmark (later Queen Alexandra).
 March 14 – Queen Victoria issues Letters Patent granting Goulburn, New South Wales, city status, making it Australia's first inland city.
 March 19 – The  is destroyed on her maiden voyage, while attempting to run the blockade into Charleston, South Carolina. The wreck is discovered exactly 102 years later, by E. Lee Spence.
 March 30 – Prince Wilhelm George of Denmark, 17, is elected by the Hellenic Parliament as George, King of the Hellenes; he will reign in Greece for 50 years. He arrives in Athens on October 30 to take the throne.

April–June 
 April 14 – The Treaty of Huế is signed between Vietnam and the French Empire.
 April 17–May 2 – American Civil War – Grierson's Raid: Union cavalrymen are ambushed, while crossing the Tickfaw River in Mississippi.
 April 20 – American Civil War: The Battle of Washington ends inconclusively in Beaufort County, North Carolina.
 April 21
 : Bahá'u'lláh begins a 12-day stay in the Najibiyyih gardens, Baghdad (now known as the Garden of Ridván) during which he declares his station as He whom God shall make manifest. This date is celebrated in the Baháʼí Faith as the festival of Ridván.
 January Uprising: The Polish peasant army, now led by Zygmunt Sierakowski, achieves its first victory over the Russian army, near Raguva.
 April 30 – Battle of Camarón in Mexico: 65 soldiers of the French Foreign Legion fight 2,000 Mexicans.

 May 1–4 – American Civil War – Battle of Chancellorsville: General Robert E. Lee defeats Union forces with 13,000 Confederate casualties, among them Stonewall Jackson (fatally wounded by friendly fire), and 17,500 Union casualties.
 May 8
 The Granadine Confederation becomes the United States of Colombia, under President Tomás Cipriano de Mosquera.
 January Uprising: The Polish insurgent army is defeated by the Russians near Gudiškis.
 May 14 – American Civil War – Battle of Jackson, Mississippi: Union General Ulysses S. Grant defeats Confederate General Joseph E. Johnston, opening the way for the siege of Vicksburg.
 May 17
 After a 2-month siege, the French army of Bazaine takes Puebla, Mexico.
 The opening of Salon des Refusés in Paris draws attention to paintings by avant-garde artists, notably Manet's Le Déjeuner sur l’herbe.
 May 18 – American Civil War: The siege of Vicksburg begins (ends July 4, when 30,189 Confederate men surrender).
 May 21
 American Civil War: The siege of Port Hudson, Louisiana, by Union forces begins.
 The General Conference of Seventh-day Adventists is formed in Battle Creek, Michigan.
 May 28 – American Civil War – The 54th Massachusetts, the first African-American regiment, leaves Boston to fight for the Union.
 May 31 – The first Prix de l'Arc de Triomphe horse race is held.
 June 7 – French intervention in Mexico: French forces enter Mexico City.
 June 9 – American Civil War: The Battle of Brandy Station, Virginia, ends inconclusively.
 June 12 – The Arts Club is founded by Charles Dickens, Frederic Leighton and others in Hanover Square, London.
 June 13 – Samuel Butler's dystopian article "Darwin among the Machines" is published (under the pen name Cellarius) in The Press newspaper in Christchurch, New Zealand; it will be incorporated into his novel Erewhon (1872).
 June 14 – American Civil War – Second Battle of Winchester: A Union garrison is defeated by the Army of Northern Virginia, in the Shenandoah Valley town of Winchester, Virginia.
 June 17 – American Civil War: The Battle of Aldie in the Gettysburg Campaign ends inconclusively.
 June 20 – West Virginia is admitted as the 35th U.S. state.

July–September 

 July – First successful test of the CSA hand-propelled submarine H. L. Hunley.
 July 1 – Slavery is abolished in the Dutch colonies of Suriname (independent from 1975) and Curaçao and Dependencies.
 July 1 – The Kingston loop line of the London and South Western Railway opens.
 July 1–3 – American Civil War: Battle of Gettysburg – Union forces under George G. Meade turn back a Confederate invasion by Robert E. Lee in the largest battle of the war (28,000 Confederate casualties, 23,000 Union).
 July 4 – American Civil War: Siege of Vicksburg – Ulysses S. Grant and the Union army capture the Confederate city Vicksburg, Mississippi, after the town surrenders, following a 47-day siege.
 July 6 – Queen Victoria issues Letters Patent, annexing to South Australia the part of the colony of New South Wales that will later become the Northern Territory.
 July 9 – American Civil War: The Siege of Port Hudson ends, and the Union controls the entire Mississippi River for the first time.
 July 13 – American Civil War – New York City draft riots: In New York City, opponents of conscription begin 3 days of violent rioting, which will be regarded as the worst in the history of the United States with around 120 killed.
 July 16 – Battle of Shimonoseki Straits: The screw sloop  engages with the Chōshū Domain fleet before withdrawing, in Japan's first naval engagement between elements of modern navies.
 July 17 – The New Zealand Wars against the Māori people resume, as British forces in New Zealand led by Duncan Cameron begin their Invasion of the Waikato.
 July 17 – American Civil War – Battle of Honey Springs: Union troops win a strategic victory over the Confederates, for control of Indian Territory north of the Arkansas River.
 July 18 – American Civil War: The first formal African American military unit, the 54th Massachusetts Volunteer Infantry, unsuccessfully assaults Confederate-held Fort Wagner but their valiant fighting still proves the worth of African American soldiers during the war. Their commander, Colonel Robert Shaw, is shot leading the attack, and is buried with his men (450 Union, along with 175 Confederate).
 July 26 – American Civil War – Morgan's Raid: At Salineville, Ohio, Confederate cavalry leader John Hunt Morgan and 375 of his volunteers are captured by Union forces.
 July 30 – American Indian Wars: Representatives of the United States and tribal leaders including Chief Pocatello (of the Shoshone) sign the Treaty of Box Elder.
 August 1
 At the suggestion of Senator J. V. Snellman and the order of Emperor Alexander II, full rights were promised to the Finnish language by a language regulation in the Grand Duchy of Finland. 
 The pharmaceutical brand Bayer is founded by Friedrich Bayer in Germany.
 August 3 – Otago Boys' High School is founded in New Zealand.
 August 8 – American Civil War: Following his defeat in the Battle of Gettysburg, General Robert E. Lee sends a letter of resignation to Confederate President Jefferson Davis (Davis refuses the request upon receipt).
 August 15–17 – Bombardment of Kagoshima: The British Royal Navy bombards the town of Kagoshima in Japan in retribution, after the Namamugi Incident of 1862.
 August 16 – After Spain's annexation of the Dominican Republic, rebels raise the Dominican flag in Santiago to begin the Dominican Restoration War.
 August 17 – American Civil War: In Charleston, South Carolina, Union batteries and ships bombard Confederate-held Fort Sumter (the bombardment does not end until December 31).
 August 21 – American Civil War–
 Battle of Lawrence: Lawrence, Kansas, is attacked by William Quantrill's raiders, who kill an estimated 200 men and boys. The raid becomes notorious in the North as one of the most vicious atrocities of the Civil War.
 American clipper Anglo Saxon (westbound) is captured and burned by Confederate privateer Florida, off the south coast of Ireland.
 August 26 – The Swedish-language liberal newspaper Helsingfors Dagblad proposed the current blue-and-white cross flag as the flag of Finland.
 September – The Western Railroad from Fayetteville, North Carolina, to the coal fields of Egypt, North Carolina, is completed.
 September 6 – American Civil War: Confederates evacuate Battery Wagner and Morris Island, in South Carolina.
 September 19–20 – American Civil War – Battle of Chickamauga: Confederate forces turn back a Union invasion of Georgia.
 September 30 – Georges Bizet's opera Les pêcheurs de perles debuts, at the Théâtre Lyrique in Paris.

October–December 
 October 3 – U.S. President Abraham Lincoln proclaims a national Thanksgiving Day, to be celebrated on the final Thursday in November.
 October 5 – The Brooklyn, Bath and Coney Island Rail Road starts operations in Brooklyn, New York; this is now the oldest right-of-way on the New York City Subway, the largest rapid transit system in the United States, and one of the largest in the world.
 October 14 – American Civil War – Battle of Bristoe Station: Confederate General Robert E. Lee's forces fail to drive the Union army out of Virginia.
 October 15 – American Civil War: The Confederate submarine H. L. Hunley sinks during a test, killing Horace Lawson Hunley (its inventor) and a crew of seven.
 October 26–29 – The Resolutions of the Geneva International Conference are signed by sixteen countries meeting in Geneva agreeing to form the International Red Cross.
 October 29 – American Civil War – Battle of Wauhatchie: Forces under Union General Ulysses S. Grant, having fought through the night, ward off a Confederate attack led by General James Longstreet. Union forces thus open a supply line into Chattanooga, Tennessee.
 November 4 – Hector Berlioz's opera Les Troyens is performed for the first time, at the Théâtre Lyrique in Paris.
 November 15 – King Christian IX of Denmark succeeds his distant cousin Frederick VII, giving rise to the beginning of the Second Schleswig-Holstein crisis.
 November 16 – American Civil War – Battle of Campbell's Station: Near Knoxville, Tennessee, Confederate troops led by General James Longstreet unsuccessfully attack Union forces under General Ambrose Burnside.
 November 17 – American Civil War – Siege of Knoxville: Confederate forces led by General James Longstreet place Knoxville, Tennessee, under siege (the two-week-long siege and an attack are unsuccessful).
 November 18 – King Christian IX of Denmark signs the November Constitution, which declares Schleswig to be part of Denmark, regarded by the German Confederation as a violation of the London Protocol of 1852, leading to the German–Danish war of 1864.
 November 19 – American Civil War: U. S. President Abraham Lincoln delivers the Gettysburg Address, at the military cemetery dedication ceremony in Gettysburg, Pennsylvania.
 November 23 – American Civil War – Battle of Chattanooga III: Union forces led by General Ulysses S. Grant reinforce troops at Chattanooga, Tennessee, and counter-attack Confederate troops.
 November 24 – American Civil War – Battle of Lookout Mountain: Near Chattanooga, Tennessee, Union forces under General Ulysses S. Grant capture Lookout Mountain, and begin to break the Confederate siege of the city, led by General Braxton Bragg.
 November 25 – American Civil War – Battle of Missionary Ridge: At Missionary Ridge in Tennessee, Union forces led by General Ulysses S. Grant break the siege of Chattanooga, by routing Confederate troops under General Braxton Bragg.
 November 26 – American Civil War – Mine Run: Union forces under General George Meade position against troops led by Confederate General Robert E. Lee (Meade's forces can not find any weaknesses in the Confederate lines, and give up trying after five days).
 November 27 – American Civil War: Confederate cavalry leader John Hunt Morgan and several of his men escape the Ohio state prison, and return safely to the South.
 December 1 – The first steam-operated passenger railway opens in New Zealand, at Christchurch in South Island.
 December 6 – C.S.A.C. Fides Quadrat Intellectum, the First Reformed student society, is founded at the Theologische Universiteit Kampen (Broederweg), in Kampen, the Netherlands.
 December 8 – The Church of the Company Fire in Santiago, Chile, kills between 2,000 and 3,000 people.
 December 15
 Romania opens its first mountain railway (from Anina to Oravița).
 Gerard Adriaan Heineken, 22, buys the brewery 'De Hooiberg' ("The Haystack") in Amsterdam.
 December 19 – Linoleum is patented in the United Kingdom.

Date unknown 
 The Second Anglo-Ashanti war begins.
 Bartolomé Mitre secretly backs the revolt of Venancio Flores, against the Uruguayan Blanco government.
 The Chōshū Five leave Japan secretly to study at University College London, which is part of the ending of sakoku.
 Douglas becomes the capital of the Isle of Man, after its parliament (Tynwald) moves its chambers from Castletown.
 The first outbreak of phylloxera on the European mainland is observed, in the vineyards of the southern Rhône region of France.
 The recipe for the herbal liqueur Bénédictine is devised by Alexandre Le Grand in Fécamp, France.
 Richard Owen publishes the first description of a fossilised bird, Archaeopteryx.
 The Winged Victory of Samothrace is found at Samothrace by Charles Champoiseau. Made c. 190 BC, it will be displayed in the Louvre, Paris.
 Colmar Treasure is discovered

Births

January–March 

 January 1 – Pierre de Coubertin, French founder of the modern Olympic Games (d. 1937)
 January 7 – Anna Murray Vail, American botanist and first librarian of the New York Botanical Garden (d. 1955)
 January 12 – Swami Vivekananda, Indian religious leader (d. 1902)
 January 14 – Manuel Gomes da Costa, Portuguese general, who served as the 10th president of Portugal (d. 1929)
 January 15 – Wilhelm Marx, Chancellor of Germany (d. 1946)
 January 17 
 David Lloyd George, Prime Minister of the United Kingdom (d. 1945)
 Constantin Stanislavski, Russian theatre practitioner, founder of modern realistic acting (d. 1938)
 January 28 – Ernest William Christmas, Australian painter (d. 1918)
 February 11 – John F. Fitzgerald, Mayor of Boston (d. 1950)
 March 1 – Sydney Deane, Australian cricketer, actor (d. 1934)
 March 9 – Emelie Tracy Y. Swett, American author (d. 1892)
 March 11 – Andrew Stoddart, English sportsman (d. 1915)
 March 12 – Gabriele D'Annunzio, Italian writer, war hero and politician (d. 1938)
 March 13 – Maria Mikhailovich Volkonskaya, Russian princess, Catholic convert and writer
 March 27 – Henry Royce, English automobile pioneer (d. 1933)

April–June 
 April 15 – Ida Freund, Austrian-born chemist and educator (d. 1914)
 April 18 – Count Leopold Berchtold, Austro-Hungarian foreign minister (d. 1942)
 April 20 – Helen Dortch Longstreet, American social advocate, librarian, and newspaper woman (d. 1962)
 April 28 – Josiah Thomas, Australian politician (d. 1933)
 April 29 
 William Randolph Hearst, American newspaper publisher (d. 1951)
 Mary Theresa Ledóchowska, Polish missionary sister (d. 1922)
 May 18 – Ehrhard Schmidt, German admiral (d. 1946)
 May 21 – Archduke Eugen of Austria, Austrian field marshal (d. 1954)
 May 24 – George Grey Barnard, American sculptor (d. 1938)
 May 29 – Arthur Mold, English cricketer (d. 1921)
 June 2 – Felix Weingartner, Austrian conductor (d. 1942)
 June 13 – Lucy, Lady Duff-Gordon, English fashion designer (d. 1942)
 June 17 – Charles Michael, Duke of Mecklenburg, head of the House of Mecklenburg-Strelitz (d. 1934)

July–September 

 July 1 – William Grant Stairs, Canadian explorer (d. 1892)
 July 4 – Hugo Winckler, German archaeologist, historian who uncovered the capital of the Hittite Empire (Hattusa) (d. 1913)
 July 6 – Reginald McKenna, British Chancellor of the Exchequer (1915-1916) (d. 1943)
 July 15 – Gonzalo Córdova, 21st president of Ecuador (d. 1928)
 July 21 – C. Aubrey Smith, English actor (d. 1948)
 July 25 – Alison Skipworth, English actress (d. 1952)
 July 30 – Henry Ford, American automobile manufacturer, industrialist (d. 1947)
 August 1 – Gaston Doumergue, President of France during the Third Republic (d. 1937)
 August 3 – Géza Gárdonyi, Hungarian author (d. 1922)
 August 17 – Gene Stratton-Porter, American author, screenwriter and naturalist (d. 1924)
 August 23 – Princess Amélie Rives Troubetzkoy, American author (d. 1945)
 August 24 – Carrie Ashton Johnson, American editor, author (d. 1949)
 August 24 – Dragutin Lerman, Croatian writer, African explorer, East Congo commissioner (d. 1918)
 September 1 – João Pinheiro Chagas, Prime Minister of Portugal (d. 1925)
 September 13
 Arthur Henderson, Scottish politician, recipient of the Nobel Peace Prize (d. 1935)
 Franz von Hipper, German admiral (d. 1932)
 September 21 – John Bunny, American film comedian (d. 1915)
 September 22 
 Alexandre Yersin, Swiss-French physician, bacteriologist (d. 1943) 
 G. R. S. Mead, British writer (d. 1933)
 September 25 – S. Isadore Miner, American columnist writing as "Pauline Periwinkle" (d. 1916)
 September 28 – King Carlos I of Portugal (d. 1908)
 September 30 – Reinhard Scheer, German admiral (d. 1928)

October–December 
 October 4 – Samuel P. Bush, American businessman and industrialist (d. 1948)
 October 7 – Clarence Stewart Williams, American admiral (d. 1951)
 October 11
 Lionel Cripps, Rhodesian politician (d. 1950)
 Louis Cyr, Canadian strongman (d. 1912)
 October 16 – Austen Chamberlain, English politician, recipient of the Nobel Peace Prize (d. 1937)
 November 8 – Eero Järnefelt, Finnish realist painter (d. 1937)
 November 11 – Paul Signac, French Neo-Impressionist painter (d. 1935) 
 November 14 – Leo Baekeland Belgian-born American chemist (d. 1944)
 November 20 – Zeffie Tilbury, English stage, film actress (daughter of Lydia Thompson) (d. 1950)
 November 23 – János Hadik, 19th prime minister of Hungary (d. 1933)
 November 24 – Leberecht Maass, German admiral (d. 1914)
 November 28 – Eremia Grigorescu, Romanian general (d. 1919)
 November 30 – Andrés Bonifacio, Filipino revolutionary leader (d. 1897)
 December 1 
 Qasim Amin, Egyptian writer (d. 1908)
 Black Elk/ Heȟáka Sápa', Oglala Teton Lakota (Western Sioux) medicine/holy man  (d. 1950)
 December 5 – Paul Painlevé, mathematician and 2-time prime minister of France (d. 1933)
 December 7 
 Felix Calonder, Swiss politician (d. 1952)
 Richard Warren Sears, American businessman (d. 1914) 
 Pietro Mascagni, Italian composer (d. 1945)
 December 8 – Albert Abrams, American doctor (d. 1924)
 December 11
 Georg Bruchmüller, German artillery officer (d. 1948)
 Annie Jump Cannon, American astronomer (d. 1941)

 December 12
 Edvard Munch, Norwegian painter (d. 1944)
 Sahibzada Abdul Qayyum, British India politician, educationist (d. 1937)
 December 13 – Harry Todd, American actor (d. 1935)
 December 14 – Kenneth Balfour, British Conservative Party politician (d. 1936)
 December 16 – George Santayana, Spanish-born philosopher, poet, essayist and novelist (d. 1952)
 December 18 – Archduke Franz Ferdinand of Austria (d. 1914)

Date unknown 
 Fanny Huntington Runnells Poole, American book reviewer (d. 1940)
 Kate Tyrrell, Irish sailor, shipping company owner, captain of the Denbighshire Lass (d. 1921)
 Ibrahim Ujani, Bengali qari and teacher (d. 1943)

Deaths

January–June 

 January 1 – William B. Renshaw, United States Navy officer (killed in action) (b. 1816)
 February 7 – William Farquharson Burnett, British commodore (drowned) (b. 1815)
 February 10 – Emma Catherine Embury, American author (b. 1806)
 April 1 – Jakob Steiner, Swiss mathematician (b. 1796)
 April 10 – Giovanni Battista Amici, Italian astronomer, microscopist and botanist (b. 1786)
 April 21 – Sir Robert Bateson, 1st Baronet, Irish nobility (b. 1782)
 May 7 – Earl Van Dorn, American Confederate general (b. 1820)
 May 10 – Thomas J. "Stonewall" Jackson, American Confederate general (b. 1824)
 June 7 – Antonio Valero de Bernabé, Latin American liberator (b. 1790)
 June 9 – Dost Mohammad Khan, Emir of Kabul, King of Kandahar (b. 1793)
 June 24 – Sir George Elliot, British admiral (b. 1784)
 June 26 – Andrew Hull Foote, American admiral (b. 1806)

July–December 

 July 1 – John F. Reynolds, American general (b. 1820)
 July 5 – Lewis Armistead, American Confederate general (b. 1817)
July 10 – Clement Clarke Moore, American writer and teacher (b. 1779)
 July 18 – Robert Gould Shaw, American Union Army officer (b. 1837)
 July 21 – Josephine Kablick, Czech botanist and paleontologist (b. 1787) 
 July 26 – Sam Houston, first President of the Republic of Texas (b. 1793)
 August 1 – Jind Kaur, Indian royal, Maharani of Punjab (b. 1817)
 August 13 – Eugène Delacroix, French painter (b. 1798)
 September 17 – Alfred de Vigny, French author (b. 1797)
 September 20 – Jacob Grimm, German folklorist (b. 1785)
 September 21 – Benjamin Hardin Helm, Confederate politician and general (b. 1831)
 October 13 – Philippe Antoine d'Ornano, Marshal of France (b. 1784)
 November 2 – Theodore Judah, American railroad engineer (b. 1826)
 November 13 – Ignacio Comonfort, President of Mexico 1855-1857 (b. 1812)
 November 15 – King Frederick VII of Denmark (b. 1808)
 December 2 – Jane Pierce, 15th First Lady of the United States (b. 1806)
 December 13 – Christian Friedrich Hebbel, German writer (b. 1813)
 December 16 – John Buford, American general (b. 1826)
 December 24 – William Makepeace Thackeray, British novelist (b. 1811)

In fiction 
 The film Glory (starring Morgan Freeman, Denzel Washington, and Matthew Broderick) shows the events of 1863, notably the assault on Fort Wagner.
 The film Gangs of New York (starring Daniel Day-Lewis, Leonardo DiCaprio, and Cameron Diaz) is set in New York City in 1863.
 The main protagonist of Red Dead Redemption 2, Arthur Morgan was born in 1863.

References

further reading
 Appleton's Annual Cyclopedia...1863 (1864), detailed coverage of events in all countries
 Historic Letters of 1863